The men's sprint at the 2000 Summer Olympics (Cycling) was an event that consisted of cyclists making three laps around the track. Only the time for the last 200 metres of the 750 metres covered was counted as official time. The races were held on Monday, 18 September, Tuesday, 19 September, and Wednesday, 20 September 2000 at the Dunc Gray Velodrome. There were 19 competitors from 14 nations, with each nation limited to two cyclists. The event was won by Marty Nothstein of the United States, the nation's first victory in the men's sprint since 1984 and second overall. Nothstein was the seventh man to win multiple medals in the event. The silver medal went to Florian Rousseau, France's first medal in the event since 1980. Two-time defending champion Jens Fiedler of Germany lost to Nothstein in the semifinals, but won the bronze medal match to become the second man to win three medals in the event (Daniel Morelon won four from 1964 to 1976, still the record).

Background

This was the 22nd appearance of the event, which has been held at every Summer Olympics except 1904 and 1912. Four of the quarterfinalists from 1996 returned: two-time defending champion Jens Fiedler of Germany, silver medalist Marty Nothstein of the United States, fifth-place finisher Darryn Hill of Australia, and eighth-place finisher Florian Rousseau of France. There was no clear favorite, though Fiedler, Nothstein, and Rousseau were among the top cyclists along with Laurent Gané of France. Rousseau had won the world championships in 1997 and 1998; Gané had won in 1999.

For the first time in the history of the event, no nations made their debut in the men's sprint. France made its 22nd appearance, the only nation to have competed at every appearance of the event.

Competition format

This sprint competition involved a series of head-to-head matches along with the new qualifying round of time trials. There were five main match rounds, with two one-round repechages.

 Qualifying round: Each of the 19 competitors completed a 200-metre flying time trial (reaching full speed before timing started for the last 200 metres). The top 18 advanced to the match rounds, seeded based on their time in the qualifying round. With only 19 riders starting, only the slowest cyclist was eliminated.
 Round 1: The 18 cyclists were seeded into 9 heats of 2 cyclists each. The winner of each heat advanced to the 1/8 finals (9 cyclists) while the other cyclists went to the first repechage (8 cyclists, as one cyclist did not start in round 1).
 First repechage: The 8 cyclists were divided into 3 heats, each with 3 cyclists (except that one had only 2 cyclists because of the non-starter in round 1). The winner of each heat advanced to the 1/8 finals (3 cyclists) while the losers were eliminated (5 cyclists).
 1/8 finals: The 12 remaining cyclists competed in a 1/8 finals round. There were 6 heats in this round, with 2 cyclists in each. The winner in each heat advanced to the quarterfinals (6 cyclists), while the loser in each heat went to the second repechage (6 cyclists).
 Second repechage: This round featured 2 heats, with 3 cyclists each. The winner of each heat advanced to the quarterfinals (2 cyclists); the losers competed in a ninth-twelfth classification race.
 Quarterfinals: Beginning with the quarterfinals, all matches were one-on-one competitions and were held in best-of-three format. There were 4 quarterfinals, with the winner of each advancing to the semifinals and the loser going to the fifth-eighth classification race.
 Semifinals: The two semifinals provided for advancement to the gold medal final for winners and to the bronze medal final for losers.
 Finals: Both a gold medal final and a bronze medal final were held, as well as a classification final for fifth through eighth places for quarterfinal losers.

Records

The records for the sprint are 200 metre flying time trial records, kept for the qualifying round in later Games as well as for the finish of races.

No new world or Olympic records were set during the competition.

Schedule

All times are Australian Eastern Standard Time (UTC+10)

Results

Qualifying round

Held Monday, 18 September. Times and average speeds are listed. The fastest 18 riders advanced to the first round.

Round 1

Held Monday, 18 September. The first round consisted of nine heats of two riders each. Winners advanced to the next round, losers competed in the repechage.

Heat 1

Heat 2

Heat 3

Heat 4

Heat 5

Heat 6

Heat 7

Heat 8

Heat 9

First repechage

Held Monday, 18 September. The nine defeated cyclists from the first round took part in the 1/16 repechage (reduced to eight because of Peden not starting the first round). They raced in three heats of three riders each (with one heat of two riders, as Peden did not qualify for the repechage). The winner of each heat rejoined the nine victors of the first round in advancing to the 1/8 round.

First repechage heat 1

First repechage heat 2

First repechage heat 3

1/8 finals

Held Monday, 18 September. The 1/8 round consisted of six matches, each pitting two of the twelve remaining cyclists against each other. The winners advanced to the quarterfinals, with the losers getting another chance in the 1/8 repechage.

1/8 final 1

1/8 final 2

1/8 final 3

1/8 final 4

1/8 final 5

1/8 final 6

Second repechage

Held Monday, 18 September. The six cyclists defeated in the 1/8 round competed in the 1/8 repechage. Two heats of three riders were held. Winners rejoined the victors from the 1/8 round and advanced to the quarterfinals. The four other riders competed in the 9th through 12th place classification.

Second repechage heat 1

Second repechage heat 2

Quarterfinals

Held Tuesday, 19 September. The eight riders that had advanced to the quarterfinals competed pairwise in four matches. Each match consisted of two races, with a potential third race being used as a tie-breaker if each cyclist won one of the first two races. All four quarterfinals matches were decided without a third race. Winners advanced to the semifinals, losers competed in a 5th to 8th place classification.

Quarterfinal 1

Quarterfinal 2

Quarterfinal 3

Quarterfinal 4

Semifinals

Held Wednesday, 20 September. The four riders that had advanced to the semifinals competed pairwise in two matches. Each match consisted of two races, with a potential third race being used as a tie-breaker if each cyclist won one of the first two races. Winners advanced to the finals, losers competed in the bronze medal match.

Semifinal 1

Semifinal 2

Finals

Held Wednesday, 20 September, except for the classification 9–12.

Classification 9-12

Held 19 September. The 9-12 classification was a single race with all four riders that had lost in the 1/8 repechage taking place. The winner of the race received 9th place, with the others taking the three following places in order.

Classification 5-8

Held Wednesday, 20 September. The 5-8 classification was a single race with all four riders that had lost in the quarterfinals taking place. The winner of the race received 5th place, with the others taking the three following places in order.

Bronze medal match

The bronze medal match was contested in a set of three races, with the winner of two races declared the winner.

Gold medal match

The gold medal match was contested in a set of three races, with the winner of two races declared the winner.

Final classification

References

External links
Official Olympic Report

M
Cycling at the Summer Olympics – Men's sprint
Track cycling at the 2000 Summer Olympics
Men's events at the 2000 Summer Olympics